Dave Quiggle is an American guitarist in the hardcore punk genre. He played for various projects such as xDISCIPLEx A.D., No Innocent Victim, Shockwave, and Jesus Wept. He currently works for Facedown Records as a graphic designer.

Personal life 
Quiggle is married to Shannon Quiggle, (since 1999) a fellow employee of Facedown Records. Dan Quiggle, xDISCIPLEx A.D.'s vocalist, is Dave's brother. Quiggle is an outspoken Christian.

Bands 
Disbanded
 Jesus Wept – guitar (2004–?)
 xDISCIPLEx A.D. – guitar (1995–2004)
 Shockwave – guitar (1996–2004)
 Prayer for a Fallen Angel – guitar (1997)
 Mother Ship – guitar
 No Innocent Victim – guitar (2005, 2017)

Discography 
xDISCIPLEx A.D.
 Lantern (1996, EP)
 Scarab (1997, EP)
 Imitation of Love (1998, Album; Goodfellow Records)
 No Blood, No Alter Now (1999, Album; Goodlife Recordings)
 Heaven and Hell (2000, Album; Triple Crown Records)
 I Stand Alone (2000, Split EP w/ Stretch Arm Strong; I Stand Alone Records)
 Doxology (2001, Album; Facedown Records)
 The Revelation (2003, Album; Triple Crown Records)
 Blood Feud (2003, EP; Facedown Records)
 Benediction (2003 Album; Angelskin Media)

Jesus Wept
 Sick City (2004, EP; Independent)
 Show's Over (2006, Album; Strike First Records)

Shockwave
 Demo (1997, Demo; Unsigned)
 Warpath (1997, EP; Surprise Attack Records)
 Dominicon (1999, Album; Good Life Recordings)
 Autohate (2000, Album; Good Life Recordings)
 Omega Supreme (The Complete Collection: 1996–2001) (2001, Compilation; Triple Crown Recordings)
 Live in Poland (2001, Live album; Alone Records)
 The Ultimate Doom (2004, Album; Triple Crown Recordings)
 This World is Ours: The Complete Recordings (2015, Compilation; Organized Crime Records)

No Innocent Victim
 To Burn Again (2005, Album; Facedown Records)

Mother Ship
 Obedience (1994, Demo; Unsigned)
 Vital Indecision (1995, EP; Unsigned)

Production

 Dread Champions of the Last Days by Sleeping Giant
 Sons of Thunder by Sleeping Giant
 Kingdom Days in an Evil Age by Sleeping Giant
 The Infinite Order by Living Sacrifice
 The King Is Coming by Saving Grace
 Misanthropy Pure by Shai Hulud
 Eternal by War of Ages
 Resistance by Alove for Enemies
 Depravity by A Plea for Purging
 Not Without a Heart Once Nourished by Sticks and Stones Within Blood Ill-Tempered Misanthropy Pure Gold Can Stay by Shai Hulud
 Nailed. Dead. Risen. by Impending Doom
 The Life & Death of A Plea for Purging by A Plea For Purging
 A Critique of Mind and Thought by A Plea For Purging
 Neither Storm nor Quake nor Fire by Demise of Eros
 Supreme Chaos by War of Ages
 When Lambs Become Lions by Nothing Til Blood
 Unholy Anger by Those Who Fear
 When Given Time to Grow by Conveyer
 Truer Living with a Youthful Vengeance by Dynasty
 Time & Eternal by Colossus
 The Shadow Line by Letter to the Exiles
 The Absolute by Ace Augustine
 Struggle Well by Mouth of the South
 Something More by Altars
 Separation by Ark of the Covenant
 Self Harvest by Ark of the Covenant
 Phoenix by Everything in Slow Motion
 No Reserves. No Retreats. No Regrets. by Overcome
 Make Amends by Letter to the Exiles
 Into the Sea by Attalus
 Into the Killing Fields by All Out War
 Indomitable by Leaders
 Indicator by Onward to Olympas
 In the Taking of Flesh by The Burial
 Down with the Ship by xLooking Forwardx
 Death Sentence by Those Who Fear
 Beyond Measure by Dynasty
 Between Two Cities by Count To Four
 Behold by My Epic
 Badlands by Colossus
 Anthems by Messengers
 Aletheia by Hope for the Dying
 Sinking Deeper by Run Devil Run
 Shipwrecked Life by Anchor
 Omega Supreme: The Complete Collection 1996–2001 by Shockwave
 Losing All Hope Is Freedom by Evergreen Terrace
 Doxology by xDISCIPLEx A.D.
 Who's Pulling Your Strings by The Deal
 Twenty Two Ton Sampler by Various Artists
 Truth Rings Out by Hanover Saints
 Earn Your Respect by Dodgin' Bullets
 Day of Defeat by Point of Recognition
 Suffering the Loss by Figure Four
 XOne FifthX vs. Evergreen Terrace by Evergreen Terrace/XOne FifthX
 Condemned to Suffer by All Out War
 Breath Between Battles by Sleeping By The Riverside
 Necropolis: City of the Damned by Subzero
 CutThroat by The Deal
 To Burn Again by No Innocent Victim
 The Path We Tread by xLooking Forwardx
 The Harvest by Alove for Enemies
 Road That Leads to Home by Regal Line
 Cause Above the Conquest by Nor Am I
 Ypsilanti by Bloodlined Calligraphy
 War of Ages by War of Ages
 Unsinkable by Call to Preserve
 They Attack at Dawn by Bloody Sunday
 The Crescendo of Sirens by Kingston Falls
 Sick EP by Jesus Wept
 Show's Over by Jesus Wept
 Ready to Live by Anam Cara
 Pride of the Wicked by War of Ages
 Finding a Balance by Counting the Days
 Doubt Becomes the New Addiction by Flee the Seen
 Death to Tyrants by Sick of It All
 Confession by The Redemption Song
 Beauty and the Breakdown by Bury Your Dead
 A Call for Blood: A Tribute to Hatebreed by Various Artists
 What We See When We Shut Our Eyes by With Passion
 What This Means to Me by xLooking Forwardx
 The Undisputed Truth by Seventh Star
 The Best of Atreyu by Atreyu
 Something Worth Fighting For by Various Artists
 Sending You Strength by Means
 Fire from the Tomb by War of Ages
 Assassins in the House of God by All Out War
 Another Way Home by Remove the Veil
 When Dreams Become Reality by Thieves & Liars
 To Keep Me from Seeking by Means
 The Triumph by xDEATHSTARx
 Lost Art of Heaping Coal by Wrench in the Works
 I Am Undone by My Epic
 Hope for the Dying by Hope for the Dying
 From Isolation by Call to Preserve
 Ekklesia by For Today
 Can't Fight Robots by Take It Back!
 Behind Enemy Lines by Saving Grace
 Arise and Conquer by War of Ages
 Total World Domination by Sworn Enemy
 The Clearing by Sleep for Sleepers
 Prepare for Devastation by Tyrant
 Portraits by For Today
 Ensayo y Error by Georgina
 Embrace by Thick As Blood
 American Rock 'N' Roll by Thieves & Liars
 Yet by My Epic
 Unbreakable by Saving Grace
 This World Is Not My Home by Onward to Olympas
 The Marriage of Heaven and Hell by A Plea for Purging
 Revival by As Hell Retreats
 Life of Defiance by Call to Preserve
 Decrease/Increase by Wrench in the Works
 Crossroads: 2010 by Bizzy Bone
 Atonement by Your Memorial
 Adherence by Stand United
 The War within Us by Onward to Olympas
 The Great Campaign of Sabotage by Overcome
 Give Me Rest by Hands
 Costs by Gideon
 Broken Voice by My Epic
 Return to Life by War of Ages
 Redirect by Your Memorial
 Now We Are Free by Leaders
 Milestone by Gideon
 Lights and Perfections by The Burial
 Conclusions by Altars
 Reach Beyond the Sun by Shai Hulud
 Die Knowing by Comeback Kid
 The Urgency by Saving Grace
 Calloused by Gideon
 Death Machine by Living Sacrifice
 Stormcrow by The Gates of Slumber
 Laid Low by Everything in Slow Motion
 Darkness Divided by Darkness Divided

References 

American punk rock guitarists
Facedown Records artists
1974 births
Living people
American male guitarists
People from Erie, Pennsylvania
21st-century American guitarists
21st-century American male musicians